Nuthetal is a municipality in the Potsdam-Mittelmark district, in Brandenburg, Germany.

Geography
Nuthetal is situated south-west of Berlin. The area was formed from a series of large moraines during the last ice age.
The municipality originated in October 2003 from the voluntary union of the independent municipalities Bergholz-Rehbrücke, Fahlhorst, Nudow, Philippsthal, Saarmund and Tremsdorf. The municipality owes its name to the rivulet Nuthe which flows between the places situated to the west Bergholz-Rehbrücke, Saarmund and Tremsdorf and the villages Nudow and Philippsthal situated to the east and flows into Havel in Potsdam.

Parts of the municipality
Bergholz-Rehbrücke (5.600 Inhabitants)
Fahlhorst (120 I.)
Nudow (450 I.)
Philippsthal (190 I.)
Saarmund (1.450 I.)
Tremsdorf (200 I.)

Demography

Honorary citizen
The only honorary citizen buried here in Bergholz-Rehbrücke is the actress, singer and revue artiste Lotte Werkmeister.

References

External links
  

Localities in Potsdam-Mittelmark